MVM may refer to:

 MVM Arts and Science College, Dindigul, India
 MVM Entertainment, a British distributor of Japanese animation
 MVM Group, a Hungarian electricity company
 MVM, Inc., a security contractor in the United States
 MVM (TV channel), a Portuguese television channel
 Maharishi Vedic Medicine
 Maharishi Vidya Mandir Schools, a group of private schools in India
 The IATA code for Machias Valley Airport in Machias, Maine.
 Mann vs. Machine, a Team Fortress 2 game mode
 MetroCard Vending Machine, a ticket machine used on the New York City Subway and Port Authority Trans-Hudson
 Minute Virus of Mice, the type species of the genus Parvovirus
 Modiran Vehicle Manufacturing Company, an Iranian car firm

 Muniyandi Vilangial Moonramandu, a 2008 Tamil film
 MVM, magister utriusque militiae, a Roman military office, literally master of both forces, i.e. cavalry and infantry
MVM 110, an Iranian-assembled Chinese budget car